Pan Sonic was a Finnish electronic music group founded in Turku in 1993. The group consisted of Mika Vainio, Ilpo Väisänen, and Sami Salo. Salo left in 1996 leaving Pan Sonic a duo. The group was originally named Panasonic until 1998. In December 2009, it was announced that Pan Sonic would disband after their concerts that month. Their final album, Gravitoni, was released by Blast First Petite in May 2010. Oksastus, a live album recorded in 2009, was released in 2014.

Music
Pan Sonic cite their main influences from the early 1980s, with industrial acts like Throbbing Gristle, Einstürzende Neubauten and Suicide to reggae, hip-hop and dub. Vainio often remarks that their music is a merger of these two schools of music, taking the harsh and pure sounds typical of industrial techno and spacing them out into longer, subdued soundscapes familiar to instrumental reggae and dub. The late outsider rockabilly artist Hasil Adkins is also cited, as well as country music star Johnny Cash.

Some of their equipment is made by third "extra" member Jari Lehtinen. These and other custom made instruments are responsible for creating the sounds typical to Pan Sonic's music. They also use samplers and an MPC2000 sequencer. Pan Sonic are great fans of experimentation and art performances and have done exhibitions and sound installations in museums. They have also made music for Rei Kawakubo's fashion shows. The group was known for recording everything live, straight to DAT using home-made and modified synthesizers and effect units.

In the late 1980s, as part of a "sound performance", the duo spent 10 hours in a garage, exposed to low-frequency (13 Hz) noise at 125 decibels. They performed a gig in London's East End from an armoured car using a 5000 watt sound system allegedly "similar" to the type used by the police to disorient rioters.

History
Pan Sonic formed in 1993 as a techno group with member Sami Salo (who later left the group). They moved to operate from a base in Barcelona to escape the long Finnish winters. Mika Vainio later moved to  Berlin, while Ilpo Väisänen returned to Kuopio. Their first 12" was released on Finland's Sähkö Recordings.

Originally, the band was called Panasonic, but the corporation of the same name threatened legal action unless it was changed. The conflict was resolved, and the duo removed the "a" from their name to become "Pan Sonic", which was used as the title of their 1999 album A.

In December 2009 news of the duo splitting was announced on PhinnWeb – with Mika and Ilpo continuing with their own solo projects. In October 2013 a new Pan Sonic album titled Oksastus was announced. It is a live album recorded at a concert in Kyiv, Ukraine on June 6, 2009. It was released on February 20, 2014.

Pan Sonic created a soundtrack for the 2015 documentary called Return of the Atom directed by Mika Taanila and Jussi Eerola. The film examines the construction of the Olkiluoto 3 nuclear power plant in Finland. Return of the Atom premiered in Toronto International Film Festival in 2015.

Mika Vainio died on April 13, 2017 at the age of 53.

Discography

Studio albums

Live albums

Compilation albums

EPs

Video albums

References

External links
Pan Sonic on pHinnWeb

1993 establishments in Finland
Blast First artists
Finnish electronic music groups
Musical groups established in 1993
Sub Rosa Records artists